Gagnon, Quebec is a ghost town on Barbel Lake, formerly a mining town, in the Côte-Nord region of Quebec, Canada. Formerly a city, it was dissolved and annexed to the unorganized territory of Rivière-Mouchalagane on May 31, 1991.

History
Gagnon was founded by the Québec Cartier Mining Company for the purposes of mining iron ore at Jeannine Lake. In the winter of 1957, the first plane arrived, bringing materials to build a pilot plant. By August of that year, the plant had processed a thousand tons of ore. On January 28, 1960, it was incorporated as Ville de Gagnon and named after Onésime Gagnon, the first Minister of Mining in Quebec. In the summer of 1960, a large forest fire came within  of the town, prompting the evacuation of women and children. Thereafter it rapidly grew to 1300 inhabitants by the end of that year, and at its peak, Gagnon had more than 4000 residents. It had an airport, churches, schools, a town hall, an arena, a hospital, and a large commercial centre, despite being isolated and only accessible by plane.

By the mid-1980s however, following the iron crisis of 1982, it was no longer turning a profit. The mines were closed and the town fully dismantled in 1985. All buildings and nearly all of the streets were dismantled.

The town's main street and the airport's runway are all that remains. The main street became part of Route 389 two years after the town's closure. That section of highway retains a boulevard configuration, complete with a median, sidewalks, and sewers, despite being deep in the wilderness, hundreds of kilometres from the nearest active community.

Gagnon had the first black mayor in the history of Quebec: René Coicou, a Haitian Canadian, was mayor from 1973 until the city's dissolution in 1985.

References

External links
 Gagnon virtual tour on Trans-Labrador Highway site.
 Site with photos of Gagnon as it looked in 1962 - 1963

Former municipalities in Quebec
Ghost towns in Quebec
Populated places disestablished in 1991
Communities in Côte-Nord